Jonathan Dasnières de Veigy (born 8 January 1987 in Nîmes, France) is a former French professional tennis player. Dasnières de Veigy competes mainly on the ATP Challenger Tour, both in singles and doubles. He reached his highest ATP singles ranking, No. 146, on 25 February 2013, and his highest ATP doubles ranking, No. 337, on 12 August 2012.

Futures and Challenger finals: 13 (8–5)

Singles: 10 (6–5)

Doubles: 2 (2–0)

References

External links
 
 

1987 births
Living people
French male tennis players
Sportspeople from Nîmes